St Gluvias is a settlement in Cornwall, England, United Kingdom. Until 1 April 2021 there was civil parish was called St Gluvias which doesn't include the suburb but it was renamed to Ponsanooth.

Church history
The historic parish church of St Gluvias, dedicated to Gluvias of Cornwall (or Gluviacus) serves the Church of England parish of St Gluvias with Penryn. Gluvias of Cornwall was the son of Gwynllyw the warrior, King of Gwentlog, and a nephew of St Petroc. The church was founded in the 6th century and the parish was in the Middle Ages sometimes called Behethlan or Bohelland. In 1881 the church was in a dilapidated state and in need of thorough repair. It was rebuilt by J. P. St Aubyn in 1883 although the medieval tower survived and is built of blocks of granite. The church contains the brass of Thomas Kyllygrewe, c. 1485. There are also three wall-monuments of interest: Samuel Pendarves, d. 1693, and his wife; William Pendarves, d. 1671, and his wife (both are curiously positioned with the figures which should face each other on either side of the corners of a window opening); and J. Kempe, d. 1711, bust under drapery.

The Wesleyan missionary Benjamin Carvosso was born in this parish. Samuel Argall was buried here on 28 January 1626.

There are two Cornish crosses in the parish; one at Enys and one at Penryn. The cross at Enys was originally at Sancreed and was set up at Enys in 1848. The small cross at Penryn was once built into the fish market; when this was pulled down the cross was saved and resited near the town hall in 1895.

See also

Enys family of Enys in Cornwall
Glasney College
Tremough

References

 Brown, H. Miles (1945) A Cornish Incumbency, 1741-1776 (John Penrose of St Gluvias). [Wendron?]: H. M. Brown

External links

 

Populated places in Cornwall
Penryn, Cornwall